Liuxing Hudie Jian is a wuxia novel by Gu Long. It was first published in Taiwan in August 1973 by Laureate and subsequently reproduced by other publishing companies. It has been adapted into the 1976 film Killer Clans, a 1978 television series produced by Hong Kong's CTS, the 1993 film Butterfly and Sword, a 2003 mainland Chinese television series, and a franchise of video games.

Plot 
In the jianghu (martial artists' community), there are two major martial arts clans engaged in an intense rivalry. On one side stands the Dragon Gate Clan led by "Old Uncle" Sun Yubo. On the other side is the Twelve Flying Peng Clan led by "King of Ten Thousand Pengs" Fan Xuan.

Apart from the two clans, there is an assassin organisation led by "Boss Gao" Gao Jiping, who pretends to operate a brothel called Forest of Delight. Gao Jiping has adopted and trained four orphans to serve as assassins under her: Ye Xiang, Shi Qun, Meng Xinghun, and Xiaohe.

Lü Xiangchuan, Sun Yubo's deputy, has long wanted to kill his boss but he knows he cannot do so on his own. He secretly makes a deal with Gao Jiping, who sends Meng Xinghun to assassinate Sun Yubo. However, Lü Xiangchuan's plan ultimately fails and he dies at the hands of his friend who has remained loyal to the clan. Gao Jiping commits suicide after the loss of her four assassins: Meng Xinghun falls in love with Sun Die, marries her and joins Sun Yubo; Ye Xiang is killed; Xiaohe survives but becomes disabled; only Shi Qun is still alive and well.

Around the same time, internal conflict breaks out within the Twelve Flying Peng Clan. Although Fan Xuan emerges victorious, he also loses many of his loyal followers. After these incidents, the major clans have sustained heavy losses so they are forced to put aside their rivalry. Peace is restored in the jianghu.

Adaptations

Meteor, Butterfly, Sword (mobile game) 
Meteor, Butterfly, Sword (mobile game) is a 2018 free-to-play action game published in game markets including mainland China, Hong Kong, Macao and Taiwan regions, and Japan. The story of Meteor, Butterfly, Sword is based on a martial arts novel, Liuxing Hudie Jian. In the game, the character continues to fight and pass the levels and chapters to reach the next one. The character will also be in the process of unlocking his own ability attributes and various weapons. The development and operating process is supported by Thunder Fire UX.

References

External links
 
 

Novels by Gu Long
Adaptations of works by Gu Long
1973 novels
Chinese novels adapted into films